Evan Ragland Farmer, Jr. (born July 28, 1972) is an American business owner, television host, radio host, actor, musician, designer/customizer, and author. He is best known for his lead role as Jerry O'Keefe in the MTV Film and follow up television series 2gether, and as host and carpenter within the home-makeover television genre including Emmy-nominated While You Were Out (TLC), Freestyle (HGTV), and Door Knockers (DIY).

Early life
Farmer was born in Ethiopia to American parents, and grew up in Towson, Maryland, and attended college at Tulane University, where he studied architecture.

He married Andrea Smith, a Merrel Footwear executive in 2005.

Career

Music
In 1997, Farmer was courted to join Russia's highest selling band in history:  Na Na (also written Ha Ha).  As part of the courtship, Farmer joined them on a stretch of their 1997 World Tour: Prykinda which included stadium performances throughout the former Soviet Union.  Farmer ultimately declined to join the band amid concerns of being out of the country for extended stretches during a time when his mother was battling cancer.

It was a year later, that Farmer found himself again on stage playing stadiums and arenas, this time with the spoof Boy band 2gether, which included opening for Britney Spears on her 2000 Oops!... I Did It Again Tour.

Farmer co-wrote "You're My Baby Girl" for 2gether's first album 2ge+her, and was an un-credited co-writer on several of the songs for the follow up album 2Ge+her Again.

Acting
In New York City, Farmer found representation from Abrams Artists Agency and began booking jobs as a print model and actor in national commercials and on soaps including a recurring stint on the Guiding Light.

The Fantasticks
In 1998, Farmer joined the cast of the original Off-Broadway production of The Fantasticks, as Matt (The Boy) in its 38th year, joining a celebrated legacy in the world's longest-running musical and the longest-running uninterrupted show of any kind in the United States.

Shaft
While performing 8 shows a week in The Fantasticks, Farmer spent the early part of the day auditioning for film and television work and began gaining the attention from casting directors who began flying him out to LA for screen tests. By 1998 he landed his first film role alongside Christian Bale in Shaft.

2Gether
It was while filming Shaft that he won the lead role as Jerry O'Keefe in MTV's first made-for-TV movie, 2gether, a film that copied the mockumentary format of This is Spinal Tap, but this time as a parody of the successful boy bands of the time period.  The high ratings of the film spurred a TV series of the same name, as well as two back to back gold albums 2ge+her and 2Ge+her Again.  The TV series was cancelled at the end of season 2, shortly after the tragic passing of cast member Michael Cuccione.

Austin Powers
In 2000, Farmer auditioned for the role of the Young Dr. Evil in the third of the Austin Powers Franchise, Austin Powers in Goldmember, but when the casting directors saw him walk in the room, they immediately handed him the audition materials for Young Number Two, the part originated by Robert Wagner and also portrayed by Rob Lowe. Farmer became the third actor to step into the role.

Farmer has also made guest star appearances in JAG,  Working Class, DAG, and voiced several characters on MTV's cartoons; Daria and Celebrity Death Match.

Television hosting
It was while Farmer was in New York City promoting the TV Series 2gether, that he discovered hosting as a potential new career path when the producers of Total Request Live (TRL) called him in frantic need of a replacement host for Carson Daly, who was unable to get to the set for the live broadcast.  With minutes to air-time, Farmer ran from his hotel room and hosted the live show, his first time in that role.  With several follow up substitutions for Daly over the next year, Farmer began focusing more effort away from acting and towards Host, a career he found far more fulfilling and interesting.

While You Were Out

By 2003, Farmer was in the perfect position to leverage his construction, and architecture background to the burgeoning home make over genre, and became the host of TLC's While You Were Out, a show where an individual sets up a friend or family member with a surprise room redecoration with the help of a crew of designers and carpenters in only 2 days.

Top 20 Countdown
In 2010, Farmer took over as host of CMT's weekly show, Top 20 Countdown for which he was also a producer, replacing Lance Smith, who held the job for eight years.  The show ended in 2013 amid reorganization at parent company Viacom.

During that period, Farmer filmed two television pilots as Host; the first for A&E titled Dance Marathon and the second for CMT titled CMT's Dance Revolution, neither of which caught traction.

In Residence
In 2015 Farmer filmed the pilot episode as Host of a new series for United Airlines and AFAR Magazine, titled In Residence: London, which seeks to provide viewers with a local's "insider perspective" of travel destinations serviced by the airlines.

Other shows

Farmer hosted the short-lived reality game show, Bride vs. Bride, which aired on We TV in 2006. He also hosted Over the Top Holiday and FreeStyle.

Radio hosting
From 2010 to 2013, Farmer joined as co-host of a weekly syndicated radio show called CMT Radio Insider along with award-winning Lisa Dent, of the Lisa Dent and Ramblin' Ray Show (WUSN).

References

External links
 
Official site

1972 births
Living people
American male pop singers
American male soap opera actors
American male television actors
American male voice actors
American male writers
American pop musicians
American television personalities
Male actors from Baltimore
Towson High School alumni
Tulane University alumni
2gether (band) members
21st-century American singers
21st-century American male singers